Anish Ghosh is an Indian mathematician specialising in ergodic theory, Lie groups and number theory. He is a  Professor in the School of Mathematics of the Tata Institute of Fundamental Research (TIFR), Mumbai. He was awarded the Shanti Swarup Bhatnagar Prize for Science and Technology in Mathematical Sciences in the year 2021. Anish Ghosh is also a part of the INFOSYS-Chandrasekharan Virtual Centre for Random Geometry which is a group of scientists at TIFR Mumbai and ICTS Bengaluru working on topics related to random geometry. 
 
Anish Ghosh was born on 25 December 1979.1 Anish Ghosh secured BSc degree from St. Xavier’s College, Mumbai in 2001 and received his PhD degree from Brandeis University in Waltham, Massachusetts in 2006. His research supervisor was Dmitry Yanovich Kleinbock.  After spending a short period as a post-doctoral fellow at the University of Texas at Austin, he joined University of East Anglia, UK as a Lecturer and after a few years he moved to TIFR as a faculty member,

Recognitions
Besides the Shanti Swarup Bhatnagar Prize for Science and Technology, Anish Ghosh has been the recipient of several recognitions including the following:

 NASI-Scopus Young Scientist Award in 2017
 DST Swarnajayanti Fellowship in 2017
 Fellow of the Indian Academy of Sciences in 2018
 B M Birla Science Prize in 2017
 Invited talk at ICM conference 2022

References

External links

21st-century Indian mathematicians
Recipients of the Shanti Swarup Bhatnagar Award in Mathematical Science
Living people
Year of birth missing (living people)